Janis Guðrún Johnson  (born April 27, 1946) is a Canadian retired senator who represented Manitoba.

Early life and education
Born in Winnipeg, Johnson's father, George Johnson, was the Minister of Health and Public Welfare in the Manitoba Legislature and later the province's Lieutenant Governor. Her mother, Doris Marjorie Blöndal, was of Icelandic ancestry.

Johnson attended Kelvin High School, and received a Bachelor of Arts degree in Political Science with honours standing in 1968 from the University of Manitoba.

Career
Johnson established a public policy and communications firm, Janis Johnson & Associates, in Winnipeg.

Johnson was the first woman to serve as the national director of the Progressive Conservative Party of Canada in September 1983. She returned to Manitoba in 1985. She also served on the Canadian National Railways board of directors from 1985 to 1990.

Johnson worked as a freelance consultant in public affairs and also as a lecturer in the Faculty of Continuing Education at the University of Manitoba. She set up the first Progressive Conservative Women's Caucus of Winnipeg and co-directed the Mulroney Leadership Campaign in 1983. She also was active in the volunteer sector, serving on the inaugural board of Manitoba Special Olympics, the University of Winnipeg board of directors, the board of directors of Prairie Theatre Exchange and the Winnipeg Art Gallery.

Senate career
Johnson was appointed to represent the province of Manitoba in the Senate by Prime Minister Brian Mulroney in 1990. She was a senior member of the Standing Senate Committee on Foreign Affairs and International Trade, the Senate Committee on Energy, the Environment and Natural Resources and Senate Chair of the Canada-United States Inter-Parliamentary Group.

Johnson's first speech in the Senate was about the Mulroney government's anti-abortion bill, which she voted against.

In 2014, Johnson became the Honorary Chair of Nature Canada’s Women for Nature Initiative.

In 2015, Johnson was named among 30 senators in an audit of Senate expenses. She criticized the report, but later repaid the $22,706 it said she owed in questionable travel expenses, maintaining that they were legitimate and the report was incorrect.

Johnson retired from the Senate on September 27, 2016, exactly twenty six years after she was appointed. She was the longest-serving Conservative member of the Senate and Manitoba's longest serving senator.

Personal life
Johnson was the second wife of Frank Moores, the second premier of Newfoundland and Labrador after Confederation, with whom she had one son.

In 2000 Johnson founded and voluntarily chairs the board of directors for the Gimli Film Festival.

Awards
Johnson is the recipient of many honours, including the Queen's Jubilee Medals, the Canada 125 Medal, the Special Olympics Award for Volunteerism, the Outstanding Alumni Award from the University of Manitoba. In 2000, she was awarded the Order of the Falcon Award from the Government of Iceland for her efforts in promoting Canada-Iceland relations.

References

External links
 Website: www.janisjohnson.ca

1946 births
Living people
Businesspeople from Winnipeg
Canadian senators from Manitoba
Canadian Lutherans
Conservative Party of Canada senators
Canadian people of Icelandic descent
Politicians from Winnipeg
Progressive Conservative Party of Canada senators
University of Manitoba alumni
Women members of the Senate of Canada
Women in Manitoba politics
21st-century Canadian politicians
21st-century Canadian women politicians
Members of the Order of Canada